Big Sandy Independent School District is a public school district based in the community of Dallardsville, Texas (USA).  The district consists of one school serving all grades.

Finances
As of the 2010–2011 school year, the appraised valuation of property in the district was $278,305,000. The maintenance tax rate was $0.104 and the bond tax rate was $0.016 per $100 of appraised valuation.

Academic achievement
In 2011, the school district was rated "academically acceptable" by the Texas Education Agency.

See also

List of school districts in Texas

References

External links

School districts in Polk County, Texas